Ameerega is a genus of poison dart frogs in the family Dendrobatidae. These frogs live around rocks that are nearby streams. They are found in central South America north to Panama. It contains many former species of the genus Epipedobates.

Species
The following species are recognised in the genus Ameerega:

References

 
Poison dart frogs
Amphibians of Central America
Amphibians of South America
Amphibian genera